New Looney Tunes, originally titled Wabbit: A Looney Tunes Production in the US and Bugs! in some markets for its first season, is an American animated television series from Warner Bros. Animation based on the characters from Looney Tunes and Merrie Melodies. The series debuted on September 21, 2015, on Cartoon Network, and continued with new episodes beginning on October 5, 2015, on Boomerang. Part way through the first season, new episodes would premiere on Boomerang's video on demand service before airing on television.

On May 23, 2018, the Boomerang streaming service announced that New Looney Tunes would continue into 2019, with the third season being the show's last. The final episodes were released on January 30, 2020. The series was followed by the more traditionally formatted Looney Tunes Cartoons on May 27, 2020, which is streaming on HBO Max.

Production

After The Looney Tunes Show ended production in 2013, concepts for a new show featuring the Looney Tunes led to the decision for a reboot of the characters. At the time, the idea of making a reboot of all of the Looney Tunes focused mainly on Bugs Bunny and in March 2014, it was announced that the reboot would be known as Wabbit or Bugs! depending in the region. Sam Register, promoted to president of Warner Bros. Animation and Warner Digital Series a month prior, became supervising producer for the series. The animation was done by Yearim and Rough Draft Studios from South Korea (the latter only working on the first season) and Snipple Animation from the Philippines.

The aim of the reboot was for its cartoons to match the tone of the Looney Tunes shorts in their earlier days. This led to the characters returning to their slapstick comedy roots, but with producers seeking to avoid their clichés, such as the anvil gag. The show's production team placed their emphasis on writing original stories, as well as devising "modern heavy objects to cause pain", according to producer Erik Kuska, with each episode featuring a few shorts in which one or a number of characters became caught up in a situation that they would handle in their own personal way. Despite that, some classic objects can occasionally be seen, such as boulders or safes. Similarly, some classic expressions can be heard, such as Bugs forgetting to "make that left turn at Albuquerque", or uttering "of course you know, this means war". The characters themselves saw some alterations to their appearances, with some also reverting to personality traits they originally had in their earliest appearances. For example, Daffy Duck was reverted to his original screwball personality from his early shorts.

The first season of the show was known as Wabbit and focused on the misadventures of Bugs Bunny, with a supporting cast of Yosemite Sam, Wile E. Coyote and Porky Pig, and cameo appearances by Daffy Duck, Foghorn Leghorn, Elmer Fudd, the Tasmanian Devil and Michigan J. Frog. Like his early shorts, Bugs mostly finds himself in a battle of wits with opponents either because they seek to hurt him or have done something to wreck his peaceful life. The first season saw the introduction of a few new characters to the Looney Tunes franchise, many of them being new villains Bugs faces.

Among the new characters introduced in this show are:
 Squeaks the Squirrel – A red squirrel who is Bugs' neighbor and best friend (whose speech initially consisted only of squeaking sounds, occasionally giving way to intelligible speech in season 3).
 Bigfoot – A childlike creature who tends to follow Bugs, usually calling him "lady" (or occasionally "ma'am"), much to Bugs' frustration.
 The Barbarian – An unnamed barbarian that feuds with Bugs.
 Krakos – The Barbarian's polar bear mount.
 Boyd – A lovesick bird.
 Cal – A huge man who considers himself the best at everything.
 Carl the Grim Rabbit – A Grim Reaper look-alike with rabbit ears.
 Claudette Dupri – A fox spy who speaks with an audible French accent. Pepé Le Pew has a crush on her and mostly appears by her side.
 Dr. Clovenhoof – A sheep scientist.
 Eagle Scout – A lonely eagle scoutmaster who is a talented rapper and longs for friends.
 Elliot Sampson – A bobcat scoutmaster and businessman.
 Hazmats – As Bugs puts it, they are a group of "highly trained government officials" in hazmat suits that often pursue or hunt him, Squeaks, and Bigfoot, as well as Agents Dupri and Le Pew.
 Horace the Horse – A uniformed horse who often works with Porky and speaks in the style of John Travolta.
 Ivanna – A woman who often encroaches on Bugs' territory and hosts the show "Gettin' Fresh! with Ivanna" on "The Food Notwork", in the episode with the same channel name.
 Jack – A "jack of all trades" who does various work. This character was dropped after his first two appearances because his personality traits (including his screaming) were deemed too similar to Yosemite Sam.
 King Thes – A royal lion who tries to eat anyone.
 Leslie P. Lilylegs – A mean-spirited short man who tends to desire power while working for his different bosses.
 Miss Cougar – A spinster cougar.
 Pampreen and Paul Perdy – Two spoiled brats who are related to Leslie.
 Rhoda Roundhouse – A female wrestler.
 Shameless O’Scanty – An unlucky leprechaun.
 Sir Littlechin – A knight who often hunts mythical animals.
 Slugsworthy the First – A stuck-up elephant seal.
 Squint Eatswood – A grouchy beaver who hates anyone who's not a beaver.
 Tad Tucker – An Australian reality television personality with a strong appetite for rabbits (especially "a family of rabbits").
 Trey Hugger – An environmental activist.
 Viktor – A narcissistic man who likes to brag about being the best in everything. He appears in "Abracawabbit" as a magician called "Viktor Mageek", "Viktor The Science Swede" as a science guy, "Fashion Viktor" as a fashion designer, among other episodes. Along with him in each of his appearances are three young men who appear to idolize him, though they later start to idolize Bugs.
 Winter Stag – A cryokinetic deer.

According to Kuska, the focus on new enemies for Bugs to face off against was described as allowing him to do his "best when he's up against a really good adversary". As a result of the inclusion of new villains, Kuska felt that Elmer Fudd might not be "the man" anymore, having often been a common rival that Bugs fought with in many shorts, despite appearing later on in the series.

After the first season ended, the production team decided to expand the focus to other Looney Tunes stars, thus the show was retooled and renamed New Looney Tunes for the second season and featured a new intro with music based on the classic Looney Tunes theme song, "The Merry-Go-Round Broke Down". The second season saw the addition of stories centering around Daffy Duck, Porky Pig, Sylvester, Tweety, Granny, Elmer Fudd, Yosemite Sam, Wile E. Coyote and the Road Runner, the Tasmanian Devil, Foghorn Leghorn, Speedy Gonzales, Pepé Le Pew, Marvin the Martian, Witch Hazel, Petunia Pig, and Lola Bunny. Some episodes saw characters operating as a double act (a plot mechanic mainly used for Daffy and Porky, as had been done in the classic shorts). Several supporting, recurring and minor figures from the classic Looney Tunes shorts such as Michigan J. Frog, Sniffles, Hubie and Bertie, the Goofy Gophers, Claude Cat, Marc Antony and Pussyfoot, Cecil Turtle, Gabby Goat, and Blacque Jacque Shellacque also made appearances.

Season 3 featured Axl Rose as a guest star in the episode "Armageddon Outta Here" and featured his first studio recording since 2008.

Voice cast

Main cast
 Jeff Bergman – Bugs Bunny / Elmer Fudd / Sylvester Pussycat / Foghorn Leghorn / Michigan Frog / Mac Gopher / Giant
 Dee Bradley Baker – Daffy Duck / Squeaks Squirrel / Frisky Puppy / Carl the Grim Rabbit (The Grim Rabbit) / Krakos the Polar Bear / Shifty Rat / Mannermaid Enforski / Justin
 Kath Soucie — Lola Bunny / Sniffles / Claudette Dupri / Pampreen Perdy
 Bob Bergen — Porky Pig / Tweety Bird / Gabby Goat / Clyde Bunny
 Maurice LaMarche — Yosemite Sam (season 1)
 Fred Tatasciore — Yosemite Sam (seasons 2 and 3) / Carl the Grim Rabbit (Grim on Vacation - onwards)
 JP Karliak — Wile E. Coyote / King Nutininkommen
 Paul Julian — Road Runner (archive audio) 
 Jim Cummings — Tasmanian Devil / Blacque Jacque Shellacque / Liam Luxurious
 Dino Andrade — Speedy Gonzales
 Eric Bauza — Pepé Le Pew / Marvin the Martian / Hubie (season 3 onwards) / Bertie (season 3 onwards) / Rock Hardcase / Cal

Supporting cast
 Jeff Bennett – Hubie Rat / Bertie Mouse (both in Wabbit!) / Dr. Clovenhoof / Horace the Horse / Winter Stag
 Matt Craig – Cecil Turtle / Tosh Gopher / Marc Anthony Bulldog / Count Bloodcount / Hazmats / Trey Hugger / Paul Perdy / Pacifico Mule / Minnesota Rats / Curt Martin / Pizza Guy / Red Omaha / Mrs. Troll
 John Kassir – Pete Puma / Claude Cat / John
 Matthew Mercer – Bigfoot
 Candi Milo – Granny / Witch Hazel / Ivana / Bear Scout / Weasel Scout / Mrs. Allen / Phoebe

Special guest stars
 Snoop Dogg — Himself
 Axl Rose — Himself
 Sean Astin — Himself

Additional voices
 Carlos Alazraqui – Leslie P. Lilylegs / Shameless O. Scanty / Elliot Sampson Bobcat / Tad Tucker / Rick
 Diedrich Bader — Reginald St. Archibald
 Steve Blum – Jack / Barbarian
 Jessica DiCicco – Petunia Pig
 John DiMaggio – Slugsworthy the First
 Keith Ferguson – Viktor
 Grey Griffin – Vera Vulture / Millicent
 Jared Harris — Asteroid
 Richard Steven Horvitz – Impkin the Pumpkin King
 Mikey Kelley – Boyd
 Matthew Yang King – Raccoon Scout
 Jack McBrayer – Yosemite Jack
 Daran Norris – Sir Littlechin / Punkinhead Martin / DarkBat / Johnny Grambus / King
 Kevin Michael Richardson – King Thes / Snorts
 Tara Strong – Miss Cougar
 Jim Ward – Squint Eatswood
 "Weird Al" Yankovic – Weird and Al
 Cedric Yarbrough – Eagle Scout
 Lance Henriksen – Ironbootay
 India de Beaufort – Foxy Foxworth
 Mark Hamill — Hans Hamster
 Danny Trejo — Lieutenant

Voice directors
 Charlie Adler (season 1)
 Collette Sunderman (seasons 2 and 3)

Episodes

Broadcast

Wabbit premiered on September 21, 2015, on Cartoon Network and on Boomerang beginning October 5, 2015, then went on hiatus for over a year and return on April 7, 2017. The series premiered on November 2 on Boomerang in Australia and New Zealand and on Boomerang in the United Kingdom and Ireland. It premiered on November 6, 2015, on Teletoon in Canada and debuted on December 19 on Boomerang in the Middle East and Africa. In India, the series premiered on Pogo TV on December 19, 2015. The series premiered on January 17, 2016, on Cartoon Network Arabic in the Middle East.

New episodes began being broadcast on Boomerang, starting April 7, 2017.

Season 2 premiered on Boomerang UK on September 4, 2017.

The entire first season is available on Netflix in Canada.

The show streams on the Boomerang premium subscription service, available on Android, iOS, desktop, Apple TV, Amazon Fire TV, Amazon Kindle Fire Tablet, Roku and Chromecast. As of July 4, 2020, the show is available for streaming on HBO Max in the United States. However, a few episodes from seasons 1 and 2 and the entire third season is not yet on the platform.

Home media
The first half of Season 1 of Wabbit was released onto DVD on April 26, 2016, in the United States. Despite being half of a season, the DVD is subtitled, Hare-Raising Tales. The DVD contains the first 26 episodes (52 segments) but is labeled on the side as Season 1 – Part 1. The DVD contains episodes 23–26 which did not air in the United States until April 7, 2017. Disregarding the show's European name, Wabbit: Season 1 – Part 1 was also released on June 15, 2016, in Australia, and on July 25, 2016, in the United Kingdom.

References

External links

  at Boomerang (US)
  (UK)
 
 

2010s American animated television series
2020s American animated television series
2015 American television series debuts
2020 American television series endings
American children's animated comedy television series
Boomerang (TV network) original programming
Cartoon Network original programming
Looney Tunes television series
Bugs Bunny
Wile E. Coyote and the Road Runner
English-language television shows
Television series by Warner Bros. Animation
Animated television series spinoffs
Animated television series reboots
Animated television series about rabbits and hares